is a baseball arcade video game developed and originally published by SNK on 26 April 1990. A follow-up to the original Baseball Stars on Nintendo Entertainment System, it was one of the launch titles for both the Neo Geo MVS (arcade) and Neo Geo AES (home) platforms, in addition of also being one of the pack-in games for the AES, as well as the first baseball title released for the Neo Geo.

In the game, the players compete with either computer-controlled opponents or against other players in matches across various ballparks. Although it was originally launched for the Neo Geo MVS, Baseball Stars Professional would be later released for both Neo Geo AES and Neo Geo CD in 1991 and 1995 respectively, in addition of being re-released through download services for various gaming consoles, among other ways to play it as of date.

Baseball Stars Professional garnered mixed reception from critics upon its original release, with reviewers praising various aspects of the game such as the presentation, visuals and quality of the digitized voice samples but many were divided in regards to the gameplay.

Gameplay 

Baseball Stars Professional is a baseball game similar to the original Baseball Stars and other baseball titles from the era, where players compete in matches against computer-controlled opponents or other players across two ballparks. There are only two modes featured in the game: Tournament is the main single-player mode where one player compete against CPU-controlled opponents in a season. Versus, as the name implies, is a two-player mode where two people compete against each other. Most of the original teams featured in the first Baseball Stars return in this game, although some of the features within the first game were removed for a more arcade-style approach of the sport, such as team management and the ability to create a new team from the ground up, among others. If a memory card is present, the players are allowed to save their progress and resume into the last match the game saved at through a password system.

Development and release 

Baseball Stars Professional was initially launched for arcades on 26 April 1990, and was the first baseball game developed for the Neo Geo platform. The game was also released during the same period for the Neo Geo AES, when the system was originally a rental-only system for video game stores and hotels in Japan, but this was later reversed due to high demand and price, coming into the market as a luxury console on 1 July 1991. It was re-released for the Neo Geo CD on 21 April 1995, with minimal changes compared to the original MVS and AES versions. The game has received multiple re-releases in recent years on various digital distribution platforms such as the Virtual Console, PlayStation Network, Nintendo eShop and Xbox Live.

Reception 

RePlay reported Baseball Stars Professional to be the eighth most-popular arcade game at the time. In Japan, Game Machine listed Baseball Stars Professional on their December 15, 1990 issue as being the fourteenth most-popular arcade game at the time.

Baseball Stars Professional received mixed reception from critics after its initial launch. Famicom Tsūshin scored the Neo Geo CD version of the game a 21 out of 40.

Notes

References

External links 
 Baseball Stars Professional at GameFAQs
 Baseball Stars Professional at Giant Bomb
 Baseball Stars Professional at Killer List of Videogames
 Baseball Stars Professional at MobyGames

1990 video games
ACA Neo Geo games
Arcade video games
Baseball video games
Baseball Stars video games
Multiplayer and single-player video games
Neo Geo games
Neo Geo CD games
Nintendo Switch games
Pack-in video games
PlayStation Network games
PlayStation 4 games
SNK games
SNK Playmore games
Hamster Corporation games
Video games developed in Japan
Xbox One games